Olmazor is an urban-type settlement in Tashkent Region, Uzbekistan. It is part of Chinoz District. Its population is 6,700 (2016).

References

Populated places in Tashkent Region
Urban-type settlements in Uzbekistan